Mount Passel is a ridgelike mountain 4 nautical miles (7 km) north of the Swanson Mountains in the Ford Ranges, Marie Byrd Land.  Passel Pond lies at the southwest foot of the mountain. Discovered in December 1940 by members of a geological party of the United States Antarctic Service (USAS) which visited this area, and named for Charles F. Passel, geologist and radio operator of that party.

Mountains of Marie Byrd Land